Mohd Ysahruddin bin Kusni is a Malaysian politician from PKR. He was the Member of Johor State Legislative Assembly for Bukit Naning from 2018 to 2022.

Politics 
He was the Secretary of PKR Bakri branch from 2011 to 2018 and Deputy Chief of PKR Bakri branch from 2018 to 2020. He is now currently the Chief of PKR Bakri branch and Head of Information of PKR Johor.

Election result

References 

People from Johor
University of Technology Malaysia alumni
People's Justice Party (Malaysia) politicians
Members of the Johor State Legislative Assembly
Malaysian people of Malay descent
Living people
1979 births